is a railway station in the town of Higashiizu, Shizuoka Prefecture, Japan, operated by the privately owned Izu Kyūkō Line .

Lines

Station layout
Izu-Atagawa Station has one elevated island platform serving two tracks on an embankment. The station building is at a lower level to one side. The station is staffed.

Platforms

Adjacent stations

History 
Izu-Atagawa Station was opened on December 10, 1961.

Passenger statistics
In fiscal 2017, the station was used by an average of 519 passengers daily (boarding passengers only).

Surrounding area
Atagawa Onsen
Atagawa Tropical & Alligator Garden

See also
 List of Railway Stations in Japan

References

External links

official home page.

Railway stations in Shizuoka Prefecture
Izu Kyūkō Line
Railway stations in Japan opened in 1961
Stations of Izu Kyūkō
Higashiizu, Shizuoka